Onaiza is a north-eastern district of Doha, Qatar. It is located between Al Dafna, Qatar's emerging central business district, and Lusail, a development north of Doha which is set to hold 200,000 residents in the near future.

History
Onaiza housed Doha's first airport in the 20th century. It had a one-room terminal and a dirt landing strip.

The district has mostly developed in the late 1990s and early 2000s as a result of its proximity to Doha's new business district and its relative distance from the more congested centre of the city. Government officials have focused their efforts on developing Onaiza as northern Doha's new foreign embassy district. The Embassy of India, Doha, which represents Qatar's largest nationality group, is based in this neighborhood.

Landmarks

Al Meera Supercenter on Al Bayan Street.
Al Meera Supercenter on Dahl Al Misfir Street.
Doha Radio Station on Al Khulaifat Street.
New Onaiza Park on Al Intisar Street.
Onaiza Park on Al Rafiei Street.
Qatar Fencing Federation on Al Markhiya Street.

Transport
Major roads that run through the district are Al Bidda Street, Onaiza Street, Al Markhiya Street, Omar Al Mukhtar Street, and University Street.

Embassies
The following embassies are located in Onaiza:

 Embassy of the Republic of Benin in Doha
 Embassy of the Republic of Romania in Doha
 Embassy of the Republic of Senegal in Doha
 Embassy of the Republic of Macedonia in Doha
 Embassy of the State of Palestine in Doha
 Embassy of the Republic of Cyprus in Doha
 Embassy of the Republic of Yemen in Doha
 Embassy of Mexico in Doha
 Embassy of India in Doha
 Embassy of Japan in Doha
 Embassy of the Republic of Georgia in Doha
 Embassy of the Libyan Arab Republic in Doha
 Embassy of the Kingdom of Thailand in Doha
 Embassy of the Republic of Liberia in Doha
 Embassy of the Republic of Tunisia in Doha
 Embassy of the United Kingdom in Doha
 Embassy of the People's Democratic Republic of Algeria in Doha
 Embassy of the Republic of Lebanon in Doha
 Embassy of the Republic of Turkey in Doha
 Embassy of the Sultanate of Oman in Doha
 Embassy of the Arab Republic of Egypt in Doha
 Embassy of the Republic of Djibouti in Doha
 Embassy of the Kingdom of Swaziland in Doha
 Embassy of the Republic of Moldova in Doha
 Embassy of the Republic of Kenya in Doha
 Embassy of the Republic of Ecuador in Doha
 Embassy of the Republic of Bulgaria in Doha

Education
The following schools are located in Onaiza:

References

Doha
Communities in Doha